Chéraga is a district in Algiers Province, Algeria. It was named after its capital, Chéraga.

Municipalities
The district is further divided into 5 municipalities:
Chéraga
Hammamet
Dély Ibrahim
Aïn Bénian
Ouled Fayet

Notable people

Districts of Algiers Province